The 1946–47 season was Manchester United's 45th season in the Football League and second back in the First Division since their promotion from the Second Division in 1938. It was the first season of Football League action following the end of World War II, and the club's first in the league under the management of Matt Busby. United failed to end their wait for a major trophy which began in 1911, but they had undoubtedly their best season since then, finishing runners-up in the First Division behind Liverpool.

First Division

FA Cup

Squad statistics

References

Manchester United F.C. seasons
Manchester United